The National Liberal Party (Natsionalliberalna partija, NLP) was a political party in Bulgaria.

History
The party was established on 29 November 1920 by a merger of the Liberal Party (Radoslavists), the People's Liberal Party and the Young Liberals Party. However, as the three parties had previously had pro-German foreign policies during World War I, other parties were initially unwilling to co-operate with the NLP. In the April 1923 elections the party received 5.3 of the national vote, but failed to win a seat. The party was involved in the June 1923 coup that overthrew the Bulgarian Agrarian National Union government, and went on to win seven seats in the November 1923 elections after receiving 12% of the vote.

The NLP later began to split into smaller factions. In the 1927 elections the main faction ran in a coalition with the Democratic Alliance, together winning 174 seats and a majority in the National Assembly. The Kyorchev faction ran in an alliance with the Tomov faction of the Bulgarian Agrarian National Union and the Democratic Party, with the Kyorchev group winning seven seats.

In the 1931 elections the main faction continued its coalition with the Democratic Alliance, but lost the elections to the People's Bloc, an alliance which included the Petrov faction of the NLP.

In May 1936 the NLP joined the Five (Petorkata), a group of five parties that aimed to restore the Tarnovo Constitution by negotiations with Tsar Boris III. The party received 2.3% of the vote in the 1939 elections, with the Five disbanding in the same year.

A party named National Liberal Party 'Stefan Stambolov' was established after the fall of the communist regime, and was part of the Coalition for Bulgaria alliance in the 1991 parliamentary elections. The party ran alone in the 1994 parliamentary elections, but received just 0.06% of the vote.

References

1920 establishments in Bulgaria
Defunct political parties in Bulgaria
Liberal parties in Bulgaria
Formerly banned political parties
Political parties established in 1920